Lisbane is a small village and townland in the parish of Tullynakill and the barony of Castlereagh Lower in County Down, Northern Ireland. It is between Balloo and Comber on the A22 road, 5 kilometres south-east of Comber. It is near Strangford Lough in the Ards and North Down Borough Council.

Lisbane had a population of 430 people in the 2011 Census.

The village consists of the Poacher's Pocket pub and restaurant, The Poacher's Pantry, the Old Post Office tearooms, Vivo Grocers, Lisbane Service Station  (an automobile and commercial vehicle repairs garage), a community centre and a doctor's surgery and chemist.

The name Lisbane is from the Irish An Lios Bán, meaning 'the white ringfort'. No white fort exists there now. There are ten other Irish townlands named Lisbane, four of them in County Down, including one near Bangor.

References

Villages in County Down